is a railway station in Aki-ku, Hiroshima, Hiroshima Prefecture, Japan, operated by West Japan Railway Company (JR West).

Lines
Nakanohigashi Station is served by the Sanyō Main Line.

Layout
The station has two side platforms located on ground. The station office lies above the platforms and the tracks.

History 
Nakanohigashi station opened on 11 August 1989.

See also
 List of railway stations in Japan

References

External links

  

Railway stations in Hiroshima Prefecture
Stations of West Japan Railway Company in Hiroshima city
Sanyō Main Line
Railway stations in Japan opened in 1989